Roibal, also spelled Roybal and Ruibal, is a Galician surname, later introduced into the Americas  . It has its origin in the hamlet of Ruibal, in the municipality of Moraña, Galicia, Spain where 3% of the inhabitants are surnamed Ruibal.

In Galicia, the surname is in use at least since the 14th century.

History

In the Americas, the name first appears in documents dating to around 1675.   One of the first recorded instances is that of Ignacio Roibal, a soldier who traveled with Don Diego de Vargas to reconquer the city of Santa Fe, New Mexico from the Native Americans after the Pueblo Revolt of 1680.   Fray Angélico Chávez, a New Mexico historian, is also a descendant of the New Mexico Roibal lineage and was one of the first to trace it. Many Roibals (Roybals) trace their ancestry to the New Mexico cities of Santa Fe, Pojoaque, El Rancho, Jacona, to the San Ildefonso Pueblo, where it is shared by Native Americans, and to the historical area of Cuyumungue.

Notable people with the last name Roybal
 Alfonso Roybal (also known as Awa Tsireh), San Ildefonso Pueblo artist and painter
 Antonio Roybal, American painter and sculptor
 Edward R. Roybal (1916–2005), American politician, Member of the U.S. House of Representatives from California
Josefa Roybal, 20th-century Native American artist
 Lucille Roybal-Allard, American politician
Patricia Roybal Caballero, American politician from New Mexico

Sources

Notes and References 

Surnames